Andreea Florentina Grigore (born 11 April 1991 in Bucharest, Romania) is a Romanian artistic gymnast. She is an Olympic bronze medalist and a world bronze medalist with the team. She was a successful junior gymnast winning three silver medals at the 2006 Junior European Championships (team, floor and beam).

References

External links
 
 
 
 Andreea Grigore Unofficial Fan Site (Romanian)
 

1991 births
Living people
Romanian female artistic gymnasts
Gymnasts at the 2008 Summer Olympics
Olympic gymnasts of Romania
Olympic bronze medalists for Romania
Medalists at the World Artistic Gymnastics Championships
Olympic medalists in gymnastics
Medalists at the 2008 Summer Olympics
Gymnasts from Bucharest
21st-century Romanian women